Stan Browne (born 17 May 1962) is an Australian teacher, education administrator and former first grade rugby league player.

As a student Browne attended Marist College Pagewood where he was chosen in their Rugby League Team of the Half Century.

Browne appeared in 74 top grade matches between 1982 and 1986. He went on to become marketing director for the South Sydney Rabbitohs.

Away from football Browne was a teacher of Personal Development, Health and Physical Education (PDHPE). He is the author of the text book series PDHPE application and inquiry . In 1992 Browne was the education project co-ordinator for an AIDS education program.

In 2014 Browne was presented with an award for Outstanding Contribution to the PDHPE Profession.

He is currently a senior inspector at the New South Wales Education Standards Authority.

References

1962 births
Living people
Australian rugby league players
Australian schoolteachers
Illawarra Steelers players
Rugby league centres
Rugby league players from Sydney
Rugby league wingers
South Sydney Rabbitohs players